Hans Günther may refer to:

 Hans F. K. Günther (1891–1968), German race researcher and eugenicist in the Nazi Party
 Hans Günther (SS officer) (1910–1945), officer of the Schutzstaffel (SS)
H. G. Adler (1910–1988), Holocaust survivor and author
 Hanns Günther, pen name of Walter de Haas, 19th century science writer